The Hang Tuah Village is a village in Kampung Duyong, Melaka, Malaysia.

History
Hang Tuah Village was opened to the public on 9 August 2013.

Architecture
The village spreads over an area of 10.4 hectares and consists of Hang Tuah Centre, Hang Tuah's Well, House of Traditional Costumes and Batik Gallery.

See also
 List of tourist attractions in Melaka
 Hang Tuah

References

2013 establishments in Malaysia
Villages in Malacca